Stephen Burrows could refer to:

 Stephen Burrows (actor), an American actor, film director and screenwriter
 Stephen Burrows (designer) (born 1943), an American fashion designer